The Brachyopini (or Chrysogastrini) is a tribe of hoverflies. Unlike many members of this family these flies are generally darker and less colourful though some genera contain species with an attractive metallic lustre e.g. Chrysogaster. Some like Brachyopa are associated with sap runs where their larvae feed on decaying sap. Others are found in boggy areas where their often semiaquatic larvae feed on decaying organic matter.

List of genera 
Subtribe: Brachyopina
Brachyopa Meigen, 1822
Cacoceria Hull, 1936
Chromocheilosia Hull, 1950
Chrysogaster Meigen, 1803
Chrysosyrphus Sedman, 1965
Cyphipelta Bigot, 1859
Hammerschmidtia Fallén, 1817
Hemilampra Macquart, 1850
Lejogaster Rondani, 1857
Lepidomyia Loew, 1864
Liochrysogaster Stackelberg, 1924
Melanogaster Rondani, 1857
Myolepta Loew, 1864
Orthonevra Macquart, 1829
Riponnensia Maibach, 1994
Subtribe: Spheginina
Austroascia Thompson & Marnef, 1977
Chamaesphegina Shannon & Aubertin, 1933
Neoascia Williston, 1887
Sphegina Meigen, 1822

References

Bibliography 
BioSystematic Database of World Diptera  

Brachycera tribes
Eristalinae